Edward Joseph Shoen (born March 28, 1949) is an American businessman. He is the president, chairman, and chief executive officer (CEO) of AMERCO, the holding company of U-Haul International.

Early life
Joe Shoen is the son of the U-Haul founder Leonard Shoen. He was raised in Phoenix, Arizona. He is a graduate of the College of the Holy Cross and holds an MBA from Harvard University. In December 2013, he was estimated to have a net worth of $767 million.

Career
In May 2015, Bloomberg reported that Amerco's surging stock price made Shoen a billionaire, joining his brother, Mark. As of August 2016, Joe Shoen was estimated to have a net worth of USD $1.25 billion.

Bibliography
 A Noble Function: How U-Haul Moved America by Luke Krueger (Barricade Books, 2007);

References

1949 births
Living people
American chief executives
College of the Holy Cross alumni
Harvard Business School alumni
Shoen family
American billionaires